Kowloon Tsai is a place in Kowloon Tong, Hong Kong. It was formerly a village in a valley, which has now been developed into a low-density and upscale residential area in New Kowloon.

History
According to the Gazetteer of Xin'an county, Kowloon Tsai village was built before A.D. 1819.

The Hong Kong Golden Jubilee Jamborette, was held between 1961-12-27 and 1962-01-02, celebrating the Golden jubilee (50 year anniversary) of Hong Kong Scouting with theme One World. At Kowloon Tsai, now named Kowloon Tsai Park, the Jamboree hosted 2,732 Scouts in the challenging winter with heavy rain.

Notable places, streets and buildings
 City University of Hong Kong
 Nam Shan Estate 
 Kowloon Tsai Park
 Maryknoll Convent School
 La Salle College
 La Salle Primary School
 Kowloon City Plaza
 Rhenish Church Pang Hok-ko Memorial College
 Osborn Barracks
 Oxford Road
 Lancashire Road
 Shaw Campus and Baptist University Road Campus, Hong Kong Baptist University

References

 
New Kowloon